Oye is Spanish for "hey" or "listen". Oye or Oye! or OYE may refer to:

Geography
Oye, Ekiti, a town and LGA in Ekiti State.
Oye-Plage, a commune in Pas-de-Calais, France
Oyes, a commune in Marne, France

People
Kenneth A. Oye, an American political scientist

Film
Oye (film), a 2009 Telugu film directed by Anand Ranga
Oye Lucky! Lucky Oye!, a 2008 film

Music
Premios Oye!, music award

Albums
Oye (Aterciopelados album) 2006

Songs
"Oye!" (Gloria Estefan song)
"Oye", the Spanish version of the Beyoncé song "Listen"
"Oye" (Pitbull song), 2000 song by rapper Pitbull from the 2 Fast 2 Furious soundtrack (2003)
"Oye", by Enrique Guzmán and César Costa
"Oye" by Willie Colón  
"Oye" by El Tri
"Oye" by Raphael (singer)
"Oye" by Ana Gabriel
"Oye" by Arthur Hanlon
"Oye" by Ilegales
"Oye" by Pimpinela
"Oye" by Martina Stoessel

Acronyms
OYE, Old yellow enzyme, a name for NADPH dehydrogenase

See also
Øye (disambiguation)